Katharina of Hanau-Lichtenberg (30 January 1568 in Buchweiller (now Bouxwiller) – 6 August 1636) was a daughter of Count Philipp V and his wife, Countess Ludowika Margaretha of Zweibrücken-Bitsch (1540–1569).

Marriage and issue 
Katharina married Schenk Eberhard of Limpurg-Speckfeld (3 October 1560 – 26 February 1622) and had at least two sons:
 Ludwig Philipp (1588–1627)
 Georg Friedrich (1596–1651), married Countess Magdalena Elisabeth of Hanau-Münzenberg-Schwarzenfels

Ancestors

References 
 Adrian Willem Eliza Dek: De Afstammelingen van Juliana van Stolberg tot aan het jaar van de vrede van Munster, Zaltbommel, 1968
 Reinhard Suchier: Genealogie des Hanauer Grafenhauses, in: Festschrift des Hanauer Geschichtsvereins zu seiner fünfzigjährigen Jubelfeier am 27. August 1894, Hanau, 1894
 Gerd Wunder, Max Schefold and Herta Beutter: Die Schenken von Limpurg und ihr Land, in the series Forschungen aus Württembergisch Franken, vol. 20, Sigmaringen, 1982
 Ernst J. Zimmermann: Hanau Stadt und Land, 3rd ed., Hanau, 1919, reprinted: 1978

Footnotes 

House of Hanau
16th-century German people
17th-century German people
1568 births
1636 deaths
16th-century German women
17th-century German women